Luciano Pereira Mendes (born 15 October 1983), also known as Chimba, is a Brazilian professional footballer who plays as a striker for Persian Gulf Pro League club Mes Rafsanjan.

Club career

Foolad
After spending the previous season at Clube Atlético Linense, Luciano transferred to Foolad in the Iranian Premier League in summer 2012. In the  2013–14 Iran Pro League season, he helped Foolad to the championship with scoring nine league goals. He also scored six goals at AFC Champions League.

Sepahan
On 3 July 2014, Luciano agreed on a two-year contract with Sepahan for $2 million. He officially signed his contract on 4 July and was presented to the fans. He played his first game for Sepahan in their 2–0 win over Paykan. He scored his first goal for Sepahan in the next match, against Gostaresh which he scored the second goal in 2–0 win.

Return to Foolad

On June 18, 2019, Chimba returned to his former club Foolad on a one-year contract. In the first season of his presence in this team, he became the top goal scorer of 2018–19 Persian Gulf Pro League  together with Kiros Stanlley. Subsequently, He extended his contract and became the best goal scorer in the history of Foolad and the best foreign goal scorer in the history of the Iran Pro League.

Club career statistics
Last updated 18 March 2022

 Assist goals

Honours

Club
Foolad
Persian Gulf Pro League (1): 2013–14
Hazfi Cup (1): 2020–21
Iranian Super Cup: 2021

Sepahan
Persian Gulf Pro League (1): 2014–15

Individual
Persian Gulf Pro League Top Scorer: 2018–19

References

External links

 Stimac Lauds Brazilian Striker Pereira
 Persianleague Profile
 

1983 births
Living people
Brazilian footballers
Brazilian expatriate footballers
Brasiliense Futebol Clube players
União São João Esporte Clube players
Clube Atlético Linense players
Foolad FC players
Expatriate footballers in Iran
América Futebol Clube (RN) players
Sportspeople from Salvador, Bahia
Brazilian expatriate sportspeople in Iran
Gostaresh Foulad F.C. players
Sanat Naft Abadan F.C. players
Campeonato Brasileiro Série B players
Persian Gulf Pro League players
Association football forwards